Lomanthus is a genus of flowering plant in the family Asteraceae, with species native to northwestern Argentina, Bolivia, Ecuador and Peru. The genus was established in 2009. It was segregated from Senecio on the basis of morphological and molecular phylogenetic evidence. It is placed in the tribe Senecioneae.

Species
, Plants of the World Online accepted the following species:
Lomanthus abadianus (DC.) B.Nord. & Pelser
Lomanthus albaniae (H.Beltrán) B.Nord. & Pelser
Lomanthus arnaldii (Cabrera) B.Nord. & Pelser
Lomanthus bangii (Rusby) B.Nord. & Pelser
Lomanthus calachaquensis (Cabrera) B.Nord.
Lomanthus cantensis (Cabrera) P.Gonzáles
Lomanthus cerrateae (Cabrera) B.Nord. & Pelser
Lomanthus cuatrecasasii (Cabrera) P.Gonzáles
Lomanthus fosbergii (Cuatrec.) B.Nord. & Pelser
Lomanthus icaensis (H.Beltrán & A.Galán) B.Nord.
Lomanthus infernalis (Cabrera) H.Beltrán
Lomanthus lomincola (Cabrera) B.Nord. & Pelser
Lomanthus mollendoensis (Cabrera) B.Nord.
Lomanthus okopanus (Cabrera) B.Nord.
Lomanthus putcalensis (Hieron.) B.Nord.
Lomanthus subcandidus (A.Gray) B.Nord.
Lomanthus tovarii (Cabrera) B.Nord. & Pelser
Lomanthus truxillensis (Cabrera) B.Nord.
Lomanthus velardei (Cabrera) B.Nord. & Pelser
Lomanthus yauyensis (Cabrera) B.Nord. & Pelser

References

Senecioneae
Asteraceae genera